Kalateh-ye Khuni and Kalateh Khuni may refer to:
 Kalateh-ye Khuni, Bakharz
 Kalateh-ye Khuni, Fariman